Euthyone grisescens is a moth of the subfamily Arctiinae. It is found in Costa Rica.

References

 Natural History Museum Lepidoptera generic names catalog

Lithosiini